Helena Suková (born 23 February 1965) is a Czech former professional tennis player. During her career, she won 14 major doubles titles, nine in women's doubles and five in mixed doubles. She is also a two-time Olympic silver medalist in doubles, a four-time major singles runner-up, and won a total of 10 singles titles and 69 doubles titles.

Personal life
Suková comes from a prominent Czech tennis family. Her mother, Věra Pužejová Suková, was a women's singles finalist at Wimbledon in 1962. Her father, Cyril Suk II, was president of the Czechoslovak Tennis Federation.

Her brother, Cyril Suk III, is a former professional player on the men's tour who teamed with Suková to win three Grand Slam mixed doubles titles, at the French Open in 1991 and at Wimbledon in 1996 and 1997.

Career
Suková turned professional in 1981. Her career-high world rankings were fourth in singles and first in women's doubles.

Suková was a singles runner-up at the Australian Open twice (in 1984 and 1989) and at the US Open twice (in 1986 and 1993). Suková's most memorable Grand Slam singles win was against Martina Navratilova in a semifinal of the 1984 Australian Open, where she ended Navratilova's 74-match winning streak and her chance at winning a calendar year Grand Slam. Chris Evert defeated her in the final.

In 1987, she became the fourth player to defeat Navratilova and Evert in the same tournament at Eastbourne and she also stopped Navratilova's 69 grass-win streak.

Suková was very successful as a doubles player. She had a career Grand Slam in women's doubles, winning four titles at Wimbledon, two at the US Open, one at the Australian Open, and one at the French Open.

She won three mixed doubles titles at Wimbledon, one at the US Open, and one at the French Open. She also was a women's doubles silver medalist at the Olympic Games in 1988 and 1996 (both times partnering Jana Novotná).

Suková helped Czechoslovakia win the Fed Cup four times, in 1983, 1984, 1985, and 1988. She also teamed with Miloslav Mečíř to win the inaugural Hopman Cup for Czechoslovakia in 1989.

Over the course of her career, Suková won 10 singles titles and 69 doubles titles.

Despite retiring from the professional tour in 1998, she was given a wild card into the 2006 Wimbledon mixed doubles tournament with her brother Cyril Suk. They lost their first round match.

Post-retirement activity
In 1999, Suková helped re-establish the International Lawn Tennis Club of the Czech Republic and became its president.

From January 2001 until June 2008, she was a co-opted member of the executive committee of the Council of the International Clubs. From February 2001 until November 2008, she served on the presidium of the Czech Olympians' Club. In June 2007, Suková was appointed by The Czech Olympic Committee to the presidium of the Czech Fair Play Club. She is also a co-founder of the Kids and Junior Tennis Advancement Organization in the Czech Republic.

Helena Sukova is also a member of the 'Champions for Peace' club, a group of 90 famous athletes committed to serving peace in the world through sport, created by Peace and Sport, a Monaco-based international organization.

Helena Sukova got her university doctorate degree in psychology, and since February 2011, has served as a vice president of the Association of Sport Psychologists in the Czech Republic, and served on the working group of the Task Force on Sport Psychology of the European Federation of Psychologists' Associations. She works as a psychologist on a regular basis with her clientele, who range from non-sporting circles to former or current professional athletes.

Hall of Fame induction

On 24 January 2018, Helena Sukova was elected into the Tennis Hall of Fame.

Grand Slam performance timeline

Singles

Doubles

Mixed doubles

References

External links
Helena Suková  Official website

Australian Open (tennis) champions
Czech expatriate sportspeople in Monaco
Czech female tennis players
Czechoslovak female tennis players
French Open champions
Hopman Cup competitors
International Tennis Hall of Fame inductees
Olympic silver medalists for Czechoslovakia
Olympic silver medalists for the Czech Republic
Olympic tennis players of Czechoslovakia
Olympic tennis players of the Czech Republic
People from Monte Carlo
Tennis players from Prague
Tennis players at the 1988 Summer Olympics
Tennis players at the 1992 Summer Olympics
Tennis players at the 1996 Summer Olympics
US Open (tennis) champions
Wimbledon champions
1965 births
Living people
Olympic medalists in tennis
Grand Slam (tennis) champions in women's doubles
Grand Slam (tennis) champions in mixed doubles
Medalists at the 1988 Summer Olympics
Medalists at the 1996 Summer Olympics
WTA number 1 ranked doubles tennis players